Phacelia fremontii (Frémont's phacelia) is a flowering plant in the family Boraginaceae native to the southwestern United States. In California, its range includes the Mojave Desert, the San Joaquin Valley, the Coast Ranges, and the Sierra Nevada. It was named for John C. Frémont.

Description
Phacelia fremontii is an aromatic annual plant with a branching decumbent or erect stem up to 30 centimeters long. It is hairy, and glandular toward the inflorescence. The leaves are deeply lobed or divided into rounded leaflets, . The flower has a funnel- or bell-shaped corolla up to 1.5 to 2 centimeters long. It is blue, pink, or purple with a yellow throat.

The plant grows on sandy or gravelly soils in several habitat types, including scrub and grassland.

References

External links

Phacelia fremontii. CalPhotos.

fremontii
North American desert flora
Flora of Arizona
Flora of California
Flora of Nevada
Flora of the California desert regions
Flora of the Great Basin
Flora of the Sierra Nevada (United States)
Natural history of the California chaparral and woodlands
Natural history of the California Coast Ranges
Natural history of the Central Valley (California)
Natural history of the Mojave Desert
Natural history of the San Francisco Bay Area
Natural history of the Transverse Ranges